Maleficent: Mistress of Evil is a 2019 American fantasy film produced by Walt Disney Pictures. Directed by Joachim Rønning from a screenplay written by Linda Woolverton, Micah Fitzerman-Blue and Noah Harpster, it is a sequel to Maleficent (2014), with Angelina Jolie returning to portray the title role. Elle Fanning, Sam Riley, Imelda Staunton, Juno Temple and Lesley Manville also return to their previous roles, with Harris Dickinson replacing Brenton Thwaites from the first film and Chiwetel Ejiofor, Ed Skrein and Michelle Pfeiffer joining the cast as new characters. Set five years after Maleficent, the film sees the eponymous character face the neighboring kingdom's manipulated perception of herself as a villain, in addition to a subplot of the rise of an endangered, powerful fairy race known as the Dark Fae.

After the release of the first film in May 2014, Jolie stated a sequel was possible. The project was officially announced the following June. Jolie signed on in April 2016. Rønning, who co-directed Pirates of the Caribbean: Dead Men Tell No Tales (2017) for Disney, was hired to direct the film in October 2017. The rest of the cast was added/confirmed in May 2018, with filming beginning that month at Pinewood Studios in England, lasting through August.

Maleficent: Mistress of Evil was released in the United States on October 18, 2019. The film grossed $491 million worldwide, although it needed to make around $500 million in order to make a profit when factoring in total budget, marketing and distribution costs. It received mixed reviews from critics, with criticism aimed at the "muddled plot and overly artificial visuals", but praise for the performances of Jolie, Fanning and Pfeiffer. The film received an Academy Award nomination for Best Makeup and Hairstyling at the 92nd Academy Awards. A third film is currently in development.

Plot
In the five years since King Stefan's death, Aurora has reigned as Queen of the Moors and Maleficent as its guardian and protector. Despite her service, the neighboring kingdom of Ulstead, home to Prince Phillip, deems Maleficent a villain. Diaval, Maleficent's raven and confidant, overhears Phillip proposing to Aurora. When he relays this to Maleficent, she advises against the union, though Aurora insists she will be proven wrong.

Phillip's parents, King John and Queen Ingrith, host an intimate dinner. Maleficent maintains her composure after Ingrith tauntingly mentions the sleeping curse once placed on Aurora, and recalls King Stefan's death. She openly claims Maleficent killed two human fairy poachers last seen near the Moors. When Ingrith dismisses Maleficent's maternal bond with Aurora, Maleficent reacts angrily and seemingly curses King John, who suddenly falls into a deep slumber. Maleficent proclaims she did not curse him, though Aurora disbelieves her. Phillip urges his mother to try and awaken the King with a kiss. The Queen resists, and her weak attempt fails because she does not love King John. As Maleficent flees the castle, the Queen's servant, Gerda, shoots Maleficent with an iron bullet.

Wounded, Maleficent falls into the ocean and is rescued by a mysterious winged creature. She awakens in a cavern where fairies like herself have been in hiding. Among them is Conall, their peaceful leader who saved Maleficent, and Borra, a warlike fairy who favors open conflict with humans and killed the poachers near the Moors. Maleficent is among the last creatures known as Dark Phoenix Fae, powerful fairies forced into hiding and nearly driven extinct by human oppression. She is also the last descendant from the Phoenix, an ancient and powerful Dark Fae ancestor. Because Maleficent's magic is so powerful, Conall and Borra believe she is instrumental in ending the conflict with humans, either by peace or war.

Meanwhile, Aurora grows disillusioned with being an Ulstead noblewoman but is happy that the Moor denizens are invited to the royal wedding. Aurora discovers that Queen Ingrith hates all Moor fairy folk, bitterly resenting their prosperity during a time when her kingdom had suffered. She also blames them for her brother's death. The Queen secretly plots to eradicate all fairies and woodland beings using iron weapons and a lethal crimson powder developed by Lickspittle, a de-winged pixie. Aurora also learns that it was Queen Ingrith who cursed King John, using Maleficent's old cursed spindle. When the Moor folk arrive, they are trapped inside the castle chapel. At Queen Ingrith's command, Gerda unleashes the deadly crimson powder by playing the chapel's organ. The fairy Flittle selflessly sacrifices herself to save everyone as a last resort by clogging the organ, rendering the organ unplayable, while fairies Knotgrass and Thistlewit cause Gerda to fall to her death.

The Dark Faes launch an assault on Ulstead but soldiers begin massacring them until Maleficent, channeling the Phoenix power, joins the battle. She nearly kills Queen Ingrith but Aurora appeals to Maleficent's humanity to spare her, and declares that only Maleficent is her mother. With Maleficent distracted, the Queen fires her crossbow. Maleficent saves Aurora, but is struck by the arrow, dissolving into ashes. Devastated, Aurora mourns over Maleficent's death. However, as Aurora's tears fall on the ashes, Maleficent is reborn as a Phoenix. Terrified, Queen Ingrith throws Aurora off the tower to distract Maleficent and runs away. Maleficent saves her. Queen Ingrith is stopped by Borra and the other Dark Faes as she tries to escape.

Prince Phillip forges peace between the fairies and humans and the Ulstead soldiers stand down. Maleficent reverts to her fairy form and gives Aurora and Phillip her blessing. Upon receiving it from Lickspittle, Maleficent destroys the spindle and its curse, awakening King John from his slumber. As punishment for her crimes, Queen Ingrith is transformed into a goat by Maleficent, until she can accept the peace between the two peoples.

After Aurora and Philip are wed, Maleficent returns to the Moors with the other Dark Faes. She promises to return when there is a christening.

Cast
 Angelina Jolie as Maleficent, a Dark Fae and the former ruler of the Moors; Aurora’s adoptive mother.
 Elle Fanning as Aurora, the current ruler of the Moors; Maleficent’s adopted daughter; Prince Philip’s wife.
 Michelle Pfeiffer as Queen Ingrith, the power-hungry Queen of Ulstead, John’s wife and Philip’s mother, who despises Maleficent and Aurora.
 Chiwetel Ejiofor as Conall, a Dark Fae that rescues Maleficent.
 Sam Riley as Diaval, a raven that is given human form by Maleficent.
 Ed Skrein as Borra, a Dark Fae that leads the attack on Ulstead.
 Harris Dickinson as Prince Phillip, the Prince of Ulstead and Aurora's husband. He was portrayed by Brenton Thwaites in the previous film.
 Imelda Staunton as the voice and motion-capture of Knotgrass, a red fairy.
 Juno Temple as the voice and motion-capture of Thistlewit, a green fairy.
 Lesley Manville as the voice and motion-capture of Flittle, a blue fairy.
 Robert Lindsay as King John, the King of Ulstead.  The character is briefly mentioned by Prince Phillip in the first film.
 Warwick Davis as Lickspittle, a de-winged pixie who reluctantly works for Queen Ingrith.
 Jenn Murray as Gerda, a woman who is loyal to Queen Ingrith.
 David Gyasi as Percival, the captain of the guards who works for the Ulstead Royal Family.
 Judith Shekoni as Shrike, a Jungle Fae.
 Miyavi as Udo, a Tundra Fae.
 Kae Alexander as Ini, a Desert Fae.
 Aline Mowat as the Narrator.
 Emma Maclennon as the voice and motion-capture of Pinto, a hedgehog-like creature.
 Maclennon also provides the voice and motion-capture of Button.
 John Carew as Jungle Warrior Fae.
 Freddie Wise as Young Peasant.

Production

Development
On June 3, 2014, following the release of the first film, Angelina Jolie hinted that a sequel to Maleficent was a possibility. On June 15, 2015, Walt Disney Pictures announced that the sequel was in the works and that Linda Woolverton would return to write the screenplay for the film. Although Jolie's return to the sequel was not yet certain, the script was intended to be written with her in mind. In addition, Joe Roth was reported to return as producer of the film. On April 25, 2016, Disney officially confirmed Jolie's return as the title character. On August 29, 2017, it was reported that Jez Butterworth would rewrite Woolverton's script while Roth was confirmed as returning as producer. In September 2017, Jolie stated that they "have been working on the script and this is going to be a really strong sequel." On October 3, 2017, Deadline reported that the film would be directed by Joachim Rønning and it would start filming in the first quarter of 2018.

Casting
In April 2018, Ed Skrein was cast in the film to play a dark fae, with Elle Fanning returning to play Princess Aurora from the previous film. Michelle Pfeiffer was also added as a character described as a queen, later clarified to be an evil queen named Queen Ingrith.

In May 2018, it was announced that Harris Dickinson would replace Brenton Thwaites in the role of Prince Phillip, due to scheduling conflicts with the latter actor. Later it was also confirmed that Jenn Murray, David Gyasi, Chiwetel Ejiofor and Robert Lindsay had also joined the cast. Sam Riley, Imelda Staunton, Juno Temple and Lesley Manville were also confirmed to reprise their roles from the prior film. In June 2018 Judith Shekoni joined the cast.

Filming
Principal photography began on May 29, 2018, at Pinewood Studios in Buckinghamshire, England. Filming wrapped on August 24, 2018.

Visual effects
The visual effects were provided by The Moving Picture Company and Mill Film, which was supervised by Jessica Norman, Damien Stumpf, Brian Litson, Ferran Domenech, and Laurent Gillet, with Gary Brozenich serving as the Overall Supervisor.

According to Brozenich, the majority of the film’s effects were for the enormous battle sequences taking place in and around Castle Ulstead and Queen Ingrith's creation, a mix of fairy dust and iron which turns into a red powder-like substance that destroys the creatures in the film, and is brilliantly realized on-screen as explosions of red smoke in the sky.

When visualizing the film, Director Joachim Rønning pictured the red dust bombs exploding over Berlin during World War II. The wings for Maleficent—who had three different looks, were created with CG effects in post-production, but the simulated flying was completed during principal photography. He and the team were determined to make all the flying sequences look as effortless and real as possible, while keeping the actors safe. The actors wore a tuning fork rig that attached to the actor’s hips and was controlled by operators off set. This gave the actors the ability to hover and dive, which makes the action look very fluid and natural.

Music

On May 22, 2019, it was revealed that the film's score would be composed by Geoff Zanelli, replacing James Newton Howard from the previous film. The film marks Zanelli and Rønning's second collaboration, after Pirates of the Caribbean: Dead Men Tell No Tales. Zanelli said that "the storytelling in Maleficent: Mistress of Evil is fantastic", for which he said that "writing [the film's] score is a dream come true". On September 20, 2019, the song "You Can't Stop the Girl" by Bebe Rexha, from the film's soundtrack, was released as a single. The score album was released on October 18, 2019 by Walt Disney Records.

Marketing
The first teaser trailer for the film was released on May 13, 2019. On July 8, 2019, the official trailer for the film was released, in which Ejiofor's character was revealed. On September 4, 2019, Disney released a behind-the-scenes featurette in which the cast talk about the evolution of Maleficent's personality and some of the moral challenges each of the characters face in the story. On September 10, Disney released a black and white sneak peek detailing the makeup process to transform Angelina Jolie into Maleficent.

Novelization 
A tie-in novelization of the film was published by Disney Publishing Worldwide on October 8, 2019.

Release

Theatrical
Maleficent: Mistress of Evil was theatrically released on October 18, 2019 by Walt Disney Studios Motion Pictures, moving up from the film's previously announced date of May 29, 2020.

Home media
Maleficent: Mistress of Evil was released by Walt Disney Studios Home Entertainment on Digital HD on December 31, 2019, followed by a 4K Ultra HD, Blu-ray and DVD release on January 14, 2020. Maleficent: Mistress of Evil was released on Disney+ on May 15, 2020.

Reception

Box office
Maleficent: Mistress of Evil has grossed $113.9 million in the United States and Canada, and $377.8 million in other territories, for a worldwide total of $491.7 million. It was estimated the film would need to gross $400–475 million worldwide in order to break-even, and around $500 million in order to turn a profit.

In the United States and Canada, the film was released alongside Zombieland: Double Tap and was initially projected to gross $45–50 million from 3,790 theaters in its opening weekend. However, after making $12.5 million on its first day (including $2.3 million from Thursday night previews), estimates were lowered to $38 million. It went on to debut to $36.9 million, finishing first at the box office but marking a 47% decline from the $69.4 million opening of the first film. The lower-than-expected opening was blamed on the five years between installments, mixed critical reviews and competition from fellow releases. In its second weekend, the film made $19.4 million, retaining the top spot at the box office, before falling to third place in its third weekend with $13.1 million.

The film's release in India was declared as below-average by Chennai Box Office.

Critical response
The site's critics consensus reads: "While it's far from cursed, Maleficent: Mistress of Evil too rarely supports its impressive cast and visuals with enough magical storytelling to justify its existence." On Metacritic, the film has a weighted average score of 43 out of 100 based on 40 critics, indicating "mixed or average reviews". Audiences polled by CinemaScore gave the film an average grade of "A" on an A+ to F scale, the same score as the first film, while those at PostTrak gave it 4.5 out of 5 stars and a 59% "definite recommend."

Forbes film critic Scott Mendelson called it the "best 'live-action Disney fairy tale' flick since Pete's Dragon," a 1977 live-action Disney flick that got the remake treatment in 2016.

Los Angeles Times film critic Justin Chang calls the film (written by returning scribe Linda Woolverton and A Beautiful Day in the Neighborhood co-writers Noah Harpster and Micah Fitzerman-Blue) an “enjoyably deranged” continuation of the first movie thanks to Jolie’s commitment to the character’s grim quirks, though he ultimately notes the “flat dialogue, overblown battles, and cloying CGI critters” weigh down the film’s merits. IndieWire‘s Eric Kohn adds that Jolie’s natural charm adds so much “delicious flamboyance to this striking villainess that she outshines the latest heavy-handed Disney refashioning” before quipping that “only the world’s biggest movie star could upstage her own movie with each fearsome scowl.”

Accolades, awards and nominations

Future
A third Maleficent film was announced to be in development in September 2021 with Angelina Jolie being attached to the project. The first draft of the script is already written, reportedly by Linda Woolverton and Evan Spiliotopoulos.

Disney confirmed that same month that the project is in the works, with Jolie expected to reprise her role. In November, during an interview with D23 Inside Disney Podcast about Jolie's film, Eternals, she hinted her return as Maleficent in a third film.

Notes

References

External links 

 
 

2019 films
2019 fantasy films
American fantasy adventure films
American sequel films
American sword and sorcery films
American dark fantasy films
Live-action films based on Disney's animated films
Films about fairies and sprites
Films about princesses
Films about royalty
Films set in castles
Films set in the Middle Ages
Films based on Sleeping Beauty
Films directed by Joachim Rønning
Films produced by Angelina Jolie
Films produced by Joe Roth
Films scored by Geoff Zanelli
Films shot at Pinewood Studios
Films with screenplays by Linda Woolverton
Films using motion capture
Sleeping Beauty (1959 film)
Walt Disney Pictures films
Maleficent (franchise)
2010s English-language films
2010s American films